New Haven Township is one of ten townships in Gallatin County, Illinois, USA.  As of the 2010 census, its population was 478 and it contained 251 housing units.

Geography

Within the township lies the Duffy site, a Late Woodland Native American archaeological site located southeast of the village of New Haven.

Cities, towns, villages
 New Haven

Major highways
  Illinois Route 141

Rivers
 Little Wabash River
 Ohio River
 Wabash River

Lakes
 Hulda Lake

Demographics

School districts
 Gallatin Community Unit School District 7

Political districts
 Illinois' 15th congressional district
 State House District 118
 State Senate District 59

References
 
 United States Census Bureau 2007 TIGER/Line Shapefiles
 United States National Atlas

External links
 City-Data.com
 Illinois State Archives

Townships in Gallatin County, Illinois
Townships in Illinois